Savitar may refer to:

Savitr, or Savitar, a Vedic solar deity associated with the Aditya class of divinities
Savitar (comics), a supervillain published by DC Comics
Savitar, a character from Sherrilyn Kenyon's Dark-Hunter series
Savitar, the yearbook of the University of Missouri (in print, 1894–2005)